Thomas Scott (6 July 1895 – 15 September 1976) was a Scottish footballer who played as a right back, primarily for Falkirk, where he spent 12 years and was the club's regular penalty taker for much of that time (anecdotally it is reported that when such a kick was awarded he would jog up from his defensive position to the penalty spot and strike the ball at goal without pausing).

Scott was selected once for the Scottish Football League XI (goalkeeper Thomas Ferguson, his Falkirk teammate for a decade, also played in that match), and was a member of a Scottish Football Association party which toured North America in 1927, but never received a full cap for Scotland.

He was also an accomplished golfer, challenging for the club championship at his local course.

References

1976 deaths
1895 births
Scottish footballers
Falkirk F.C. players
Denny Hibernian F.C. players
Greenock Morton F.C. players
Footballers from Falkirk (council area)
Scottish Junior Football Association players
Scottish Football League players
Scottish Football League representative players
Association football defenders
People from Denny, Falkirk